Abraham ben Mordecai Azulai (c. 1570–1643) was a Kabbalistic author and commentator born in Fez, Morocco. In 1599 he moved to Ottoman Palestine and settled in Hebron.

Biography
In Hebron, Azulai wrote a commentary on the Zohar under the title Kiryat Arba (City of Arba (in Hebrew four); Gen. xxiii.2). The plague of 1619 drove him from his new home, and while in Gaza, where he found refuge, he wrote his Kabalistic work Chesed le-Abraham (Mercy to Abraham; Book of Micah vii.20). It was published after the author's death by Meshullam Zalman ben Abraham Berak of Gorice, in Amsterdam, 1685. The work is a treatise with an introduction,  (The Cornerstone; see Talmud Yoma 53b), and is divided into seven "fountains" (Book of Zechariah iii.9), each fountain being subdivided into a number of "streams." A specimen of the work Chesed Le-Avraham, taken from the fifth fountain, twenty-fourth stream, p. 57d, of the Amsterdam edition:

A popular story about Rabbi Azulai is that of how he retrieved the sultan's sword. When the Ottoman sultan visited Hebron, his precious sword fell into the Cave of Machpela. Anyone sent down to retrieve it disappeared. Only Rabbi Azulai was able to descend into the cave and retrieve the sword.

He died in Hebron on November 6, 1643 and is buried in the Old Jewish Cemetery in Hebron.

One of the manuscripts that he left to his descendant, Chaim Yosef David Azulai, is also published. It is a Kabalistic commentary on the Hebrew Bible, Ba'ale Berit Abraham (Abraham's Confederates; see Book of Genesis xiv.13), Vilna, 1873. 
Pirkei Avot – a selection from Chesed le-Abraham

References

Jewish Encyclopedia 
 Azoulay, Shem ha-Gedolim, s.v.;
 Isaac ben Jacob Benjacob, Oẓar ha-Sefarim, p. 196;
 Julius Fürst, Bibliotheca Judaica, i.67;
 Heimann Joseph Michael, Or ha-Ḥayyim, p. 12.

1570s births
1643 deaths
People from Fez, Morocco
Kabbalists
Sephardi rabbis in Ottoman Palestine
Rabbis in Hebron
Moroccan writers
16th-century Moroccan rabbis
17th-century rabbis from the Ottoman Empire